HMS Tenby was a  or Type 12 anti-submarine frigate of the Royal Navy of the United Kingdom.

Design
The Whitbys were designed as specialist anti-submarine warships, intended to counter fast modern diesel-electric submarines. To meet these requirements, the Type 12s had a new hull form and, unlike the contemporary Type 41 anti-aircraft and Type 61 air direction frigates, were powered by steam turbines.

The ships were powered by the new Y-100 machinery in which the ship's boilers and steam turbines were designed as a closely integrated set of machinery to increase efficiency. Crew was about 189 when operated as a leader and 152 as an ordinary ship.

A twin 4.5-inch (113 mm) Mark 6 gun mount was fitted forward, with 350 rounds of ammunition carried, with close-in armament of a stabilised twin Bofors 40 mm L/60 gun (STAAG, Stabilised Tachymetric Anti-Aircraft Gun) mount aft. The design anti-submarine armament consisted of twelve 21-inch torpedo-tubes (eight fixed and two twin rotating mounts) for Mark 20E Bidder homing anti-submarine torpedoes, backed up by two Limbo anti-submarine mortars fitted aft. The Bidder homing torpedoes proved unsuccessful however, being too slow to catch modern submarines, and the torpedo tubes were soon removed.

The ship was fitted with a Type 293Q surface/air search radar on the foremast, with a Type 277 height-finding radar on a short mast forward of the foremast. A Mark 6M fire control system (including a Type 275 radar) for the 4.5 inch guns was mounted above the ship's bridge, while a Type 974 navigation radar was also fitted. The ship's sonar fit consisted of Type 174 search, Type 170 fire control sonar for Limbo and a Type 162 sonar for classifying targets on the sea floor.

History
In 1962-1963 she was commanded by Captain T Lewin.

By the early 1970s, in the latter part of her career, she was one of three frigates which formed the Dartmouth Training Squadron and was used for the training of Royal Navy Officer Cadets before being promoted to Midshipmen.

In popular culture
The fake military funeral of Commander James Bond in the 1967 film You Only Live Twice was filmed on board this ship, which was near Gibraltar at that time. In the film however, it was portrayed as being in Hong Kong.

Decommissioning

She was paid off into the reserve fleet on 8 December 1972 with the final ship's company leaving on 28 February 1973.

She spent four years laid up at Devonport prior to being sold to Thos. W. Ward for breaking up at Briton Ferry, the proposed sale to Pakistan being cancelled.

References

Notes

Bibliography

External links
 HMS Tenby Association
 Video of HMS Tenby

 

Whitby-class frigates
1955 ships
Ships built on the River Mersey